Dendroplex is a genus of birds in the woodcreeper subfamily Dendrocolaptinae. It was long merged into Xiphorhynchus, but its distinctness has now been established.

Taxonomy
The genus Dendroplex was introduced in 1827 by the English naturalist William John Swainson. The genus name combines the Ancient Greek dendron meaning "tree" with plēssō meaning "to strike". Swainson did not specify a type species but this was fixed in 2007 as the straight-billed woodcreeper which had first been described in 1788 by Johann Friedrich Gmelin with the binomial name Oriolus picus.

The genus contains two species:

References

 
Bird genera